The Crescent Bridge carries a rail line across the Mississippi River between Davenport, Iowa and Rock Island, Illinois. It was formerly owned by the Davenport, Rock Island and North Western Railway, a joint subsidiary of the Chicago, Burlington and Quincy Railroad and Chicago, Milwaukee, St. Paul and Pacific Railroad, which was split in 1995 between then-joint owners Burlington Northern Railroad and Soo Line Railroad, with BN getting the bridge and the Illinois-side line, and Soo Line getting the Iowa-side line. Since then, after spinning off its lines in the area to I&M Rail Link, later Iowa, Chicago and Eastern Railroad (a subsidiary of the Dakota, Minnesota and Eastern Railroad), the lines were repurchased by the Canadian Pacific Railway, parent of the Soo Line.  Meanwhile, BN has merged into the BNSF Railway, the current owner of the bridge.

See also
List of crossings of the Upper Mississippi River

External links
Crescent Bridge postcard photo and history
Crescent Railroad Bridge - BNSF Mississippi River Crossing At Davenport, John Weeks
Crescent Railroad Bridge - Davenport, IA, Steve Kratz

Railroad bridges in Iowa
Railroad bridges in Illinois
Bridges over the Mississippi River
Buildings and structures in Rock Island, Illinois
Transportation in Davenport, Iowa
BNSF Railway bridges
Chicago, Burlington and Quincy Railroad
Chicago, Milwaukee, St. Paul and Pacific Railroad
Buildings and structures in Davenport, Iowa
Bridges in Rock Island County, Illinois
Bridges in Scott County, Iowa
Bridges in the Quad Cities
Metal bridges in the United States
Truss bridges in the United States
Swing bridges in the United States
Interstate railroad bridges in the United States